Ángel Rebelde is a 2004 Miami, Florida-based telenovela produced by Fonovideo Productions which aired first on Venevisión in Venezuela. Mexican actors Grettel Valdez and Victor Noriega star as the main protagonists while Maritza Rodríguez and Ismael La Rosa star as the main antagonists. The telenovela aired on Univision from February 2 to December 6, 2004. It recently aired on Venevisión Plus in 2012.

Plot 
Lucia is a young girl who is in love with Raul. Raul is also in love with her. One day Lucia starts working in the mansion of Dona Enriqueta without knowing that she is working in the house of her grandmother. In the mansion she meets Natasha and Mariela, granddaughters of Dona Enriqueta. Natasha and Mariela are good, they both become friends with Lucia. However, Lucia finds out there is a third granddaughter, Cristal, whom she had a fight with in the past, over crashing into her car while Lucia worked as a bus driver. Despite trying to avoid Cristal while working in the mansion, Cristal eventually discovers her and succeeds in getting her fired.

To make things worse, when Cristal meets Raul she falls in love with him. Cristal will do anything to get Raul, even kill. On the other hand, one night Lucia and Raul make love and Lucia becomes pregnant. But Cristal has offered Raul riches if he marries her and a better life for his child. When Lucia gives birth to "twins", she finds out that Cristal married Raul. Lucia is crushed, but she gets a chance to take revenge on Raul when her father Alejandro comes out of jail after 20 years. He was put in jail because of lies from Dona Enriqueta.

Dona Enriqueta always hated Alejandro because her daughter Elena was in love with him, so she stole everything that belonged to him and put him in jail. Alejandro pressures Lucia to get revenge on Cristal and Dona Enriqueta.

Cast 
 Grettel Valdez as Lucía Valderrama Covarrubias / Angela - Main heroine, in love with Raúl
 Victor Noriega as Raúl Hernández - Main hero, in love with Lucía
 Maritza Rodríguez as Cristal Covarrubias / Amparo † - Lucía's cousin, in love with Raúl, Main villain - serial killer, responsible for the deaths of Enriqueta, Alonso, Juanita, Graciela, Dr. Villafuerte, Juan Cuchillo, Iraida, Romulo, Patricia and Ernesto, shot and killed by police.
 Bernie Paz as Dr. Claudio Salazar - in love with Lucía, finally married with Mariela
 Osvaldo Ríos as Alejandro Valderrama - Lucía's father, in love with Elena
 Alba Roversi as Elena Covarrubias Andueza - Lucía's mother, in love with Alejandro
 Claudia Islas as Doña Enriqueta Andueza de Covarrubias † - Lucía's grandmother, villain, killed by Cristal
 Lisette Morelos as Natasha Covarrubias - Lucía's cousin, Ernesto's wife, in love with Camilo
 Ariel López Padilla as Ernesto Lezama †/ Romulo † - Natasha's husband / villain, his twin brother, both killed by Cristal
 Maritza Bustamante as Mariela 'Marielita' Covarrubias - Lucía's cousin, in love with Rafael, finally married with Claudio
 Carlos Augusto Maldonado as Rafael 'Rafa' Romero - in love with Mariela, later in love with Laurita
 Norma Zúñiga as Doña Lola - Elena's friend, married with Rudenciño
 Ismael La Rosa as Leonel Anselmi † - Cristal's accomplice, villain, killed in jail
 Orlando Fundichely as Vicente Lander - in love with Lucía, later in love with Rubí
 Vivian Ruiz as Balbina Lander
 María Antonieta Duque as Rubí Morantes - Lucía's neighbour, in love with Vicente, villain, Cristal deformed her face with acid
 Juan Pablo Gamboa as Camilo Salazar - in love with Natasha
 Claudia Reyes as Iraida Ferrer † - in love with Ernesto, villain, later good, killed by Cristal
 Franklin Virguez as Alejandro 'Alejo' Espejo -. Raúl's uncle, villain, later good
 Marisol Calero as Etelvina Perez † - Alejo's wife, villain, burned alive in an effort to kill Lucia
 Adriana Acosta as Rosa 'Rosita' Rosales - in love with Raúl and later with Luigi,  comic villain, later good
 Rodrigo Vidal as Luigi Spaghetti - Raul's best friend, in love with Rosita
 Jorge Luis Pila as José Armando Santibañez - in love with Lucía
 Desideria D'Caro as Patricia Villaverde Lezama † - in love with José Armando, villain, killed by Cristal who tied her up on the train rails
 Thanya Lopez as Laurita Lander Villaverde - Vicente and Patricia's daughter, in love with Rafael
 Patricio Borghetti as Juan Cuchillo † - in love with Lucía, villain, killed by Cristal with hair dryer in the bathtub
 Marcela Cardona as Graciela Santiago † - servant at the Covarrubias mansion, in love with Vicente, was raped by Leonel, killed by Cristal
 Sandra Itzel as Lisette Lezama Covarrubias - Natasha and Ernesto's young daughter
 Konstantinos Vrotsos as José 'Cheíto' Romero - Rafael's younger brother
 Alba Raquel Barros as Simona Ramirez - witch, Rubí's aunt, villain, later good
 Julio Capote as Rudenciño - married with Doña Lola
 Sabrina Olmedo as Betania - servant at the Covarrubias mansion, villain, ends up in prison
 Elizabeth Morales as Penélope Lezama Santibañez † - José Armando's wife, dies because of a chronic disease
 Hada Bejar as Tomasa
 Ricardo García as Leopoldo Serrano
 Anette Vega as Fabiana - Chela's daughter, villain, ends up in jail
 Rolando Tarajano as Marco Tulio
 Gladys Cáceres as Chela Quiñonez - Fabiana's mother, villain, ends up in jail
 Marina Vidal as Silvia
 Ilse Pappe as Haydeé
 Raúl Olivo as Alvaro

See also
List of telenovelas
List of famous telenovelas
List of films and television shows set in Miami

References

External links

2003 telenovelas
2003 American television series debuts
2004 American television series endings
2003 Venezuelan television series debuts
2004 Venezuelan television series endings
Television shows set in Miami
Television shows filmed in Miami
American television series based on telenovelas
Spanish-language American telenovelas
Venevisión telenovelas
Venezuelan telenovelas